Edward Frank Southgate RBA (1 August 1872 – 23 February 1916) was a British painter. He spent most of his life in Norfolk and concentrated on painting birds, especially waterfowl, and hunting scenes.

Biography 
Ernest Frank Southgate was born 1 August 1872 in Hunstanton, Norfolk.

He was a student at Bideford Art School and Cambridge School of Art.

He was a member of the Royal Society of British Artists.

Southgate painted mainly birds and sporting scenes.
His paintings of ducks and other birds in Patterson 1904 (for instance "The Stricken Mallard") were internationally renowned.

Southgate died in 1916, whilst serving in the Army during the First World War in France, aged 43 years. He received a short 'Im Memoriam' (in Dutch) by A.B. Wigman in De Levende Natuur (vol. 21, 1916).

Book illustrations 

Southgate also illustrated several books, for instance:

References

External links 

 Frank Southgate at Artnet (anno 2020-03-12: an overview of 149 works, sold in auctions between 1988 and 2019).

19th-century British painters
20th-century British painters
People from Hunstanton
1872 births
1916 deaths
Alumni of Anglia Ruskin University
Animal painters
British bird artists
British Army personnel of World War I
British military personnel killed in World War I
Royal Fusiliers soldiers